William Budge (May 1, 1828 – March 18, 1919) was a member of the Council of Fifty as well as the Idaho Legislature and was a mission president and stake president in the Church of Jesus Christ of Latter-day Saints.

Budge was born in Lanark, Scotland and moved in his teen years to Glasgow for employment.  At the age of 20 he joined the LDS Church. He became a missionary in 1851 and continued in that position until about 1860. During these years Budge served for a time as president of the Swiss Mission, as district president in Glasgow and five different districts in England, and also preached the gospel in Italy and Germany. Among other assignments, in 1855 the president of the European Mission Franklin D. Richards sent Budge to Saxony to respond to inquires about the LDS Church from Karl G. Maeser.

In 1860 Budge emigrated to Utah Territory. He was the captain of a company of seventy-two wagons from Winter Quarters to Salt Lake City. He lived in Farmington where he was Justice of the Peace. He moved to Cache Valley in 1864 at the request of Brigham Young. He later moved to Bear Lake County, Idaho. From 1878 to 1880 Budge was president of the European Mission, and in 1877 as well as in 1870 to 1906 he served as president of the Bear Lake Stake. From 1906 to 1918 Budge was the president of the LDS Church's Logan Utah Temple.

Budge also served as a member of the Idaho Legislature.

One of the Helaman Halls at Brigham Young University is named for Budge.

See also
 Julia Budge House

Notes

References
Ernest L. Wilkinson, ed., Brigham Young University: The First One Hundred Years (Provo: BYU Press, 1975) Vol. 1, p. 85-86.

1828 births
1919 deaths
19th-century Mormon missionaries
Converts to Mormonism
Mission presidents (LDS Church)
Mormon missionaries in Italy
Mormon missionaries in Germany
Mormon missionaries in Switzerland
Mormon missionaries in England
Mormon missionaries in Scotland
Mormon pioneers
Members of the Idaho House of Representatives
People from Lanark
Scottish emigrants to the United States
Scottish leaders of the Church of Jesus Christ of Latter-day Saints
Scottish Mormon missionaries
Temple presidents and matrons (LDS Church)